Queen's Park is an area located partly in the City of Westminster and partly in the London Borough of Brent. Some of the area within Westminster forms a civil parish, the first to be created in London since the right of communities to establish civil parishes was enacted in 2007. The area gives its name to Queens Park Rangers football club.

Architecturally, Queen's Park is an important historic area, with a unified urban layout with a high level of building preservation. The park is a good example of a Victorian urban green space, and the surrounding streets largely comprise original two- and three-storey Victorian buildings.

Administration and representation

Administrative background
Queens Park has never been an administrative unit and so it has never had formally defined boundaries; but its roots lie in the ancient parishes of Willesden (the northern part, in the London Borough of Brent) and Chelsea (the southern part, in the City of Westminster).

The Queen Park Estate was developed in 1875-81, in Kensal Town which had been an exclave of Chelsea from before the time of the Norman Conquest. In 1900 the exclave was removed from Chelsea and divided between its neighbours, with most of it, the area north of the Grand Union Canal, and including the Queens Park Estate joining with the area of the ancient parish of Paddington to form the new  Metropolitan Borough of Paddington. 

The park was laid out in the parish of Willesden in 1886. In 1900, the Municipal Borough of Willesden was formed to serve the same area as the medieval parish.

In 1965, Paddington merged with Westminster and Marylebone to form what is now City of Westminster, while Willesden, became part of the new London Borough of Brent.

Electoral wards
The area give its name to two electoral wards, which unusually are both named Queen's Park since they belong to two different London boroughs. The area north of Kilburn Lane is the Queen's Park ward of the London Borough of Brent, while the area south of Kilburn Lane is the Queen's Park ward of the City of Westminster.

Queen's Park (London Borough of Brent)
The Queen's Park ward in the south-east of the London Borough of Brent is represented by three Labour Party councillors on Brent London Borough Council as of the 2018 election. This ward forms part of the Hampstead and Kilburn constituency, represented by Labour MP Tulip Siddiq.

Queen's Park (City of Westminster)
The Queen's Park ward in the north west of the City of Westminster is represented by three Labour Party councillors on Westminster City Council. This ward forms part of the Westminster North parliamentary constituency, represented by Labour MP Karen Buck, whose spouse Barrie Taylor represented the Queen's Park ward from 1986 to 1990, then again from 1994 to 2018 in which year the title of Honorary Alderman was conferred upon him by the City Council.

In May 2012 residents of the ward voted in favour of the establishment of a Queen's Park civil parish and parish council.

Queen's Park Community Council
In June 2012, Westminster City Council approved the establishment of Queen's Park Community Council as the first parish council created in London since new legislation was enacted in 2007. The Community Council area is coterminous with the City of Westminster ward of Queens Park.

The first election of councillors to the community council took place in May 2014 at the same time as other local elections.  Subsequent elections are held every four years at the same time as elections to the city council, with the most recent  being on 5 May 2022. Parish councils have no statutory responsibilities, but have  a budget they can direct towards community projects.

Queen's Park Neighbourhood Plan
In November 2021 the City Council formally ‘made’ (adopted) the Queen's Park Neighbourhood Plan. It is therefore now part of the statutory Development Plan for Westminster and will be used alongside the council’s own planning documents and the Mayor’s London Plan in determining applications in the Queen's Park Neighbourhood Area.

History

19th century
The Queens Park Estate was developed between 1875 and 1881, in what is now the City of Westminster, by the Artizans, Labourers & General Dwellings Company, and named in honour of Queen Victoria.  The park, which shares the name, lies a short distance north of the estate in the London Borough of Brent. It was laid out in 1886 by the City of London, and opened the following year.

In 1879 the Royal Agricultural Society annual show was held on the area which would become Queen's Park. The  site was chosen for its proximity to the railway network, Queen's Park Station having opened on 2 June 1879 on the main line from London to Birmingham, just in time to facilitate the movement of heavy machinery and stock. By the 1870s the annual shows had become major events and the Kilburn show was to be the largest ever held. The show was opened on 30 June 1879 by the Prince and Princess of Wales and saw an entry of 11,878 implements, 2,879 livestock entries and over 187,000 visitors. Poor weather and deep mud led to low attendance, but a visit by Queen Victoria on the fifth day, where she was driven on a specially constructed drive of ballast and brick from the new station along Salusbury Road on a route lined with cheering crowds, rallied visitors.

In 1884 the North West London Park League was formed to secure the site as a people's park. The league appealed to the Ecclesiastical Commissioners not to sell the land for building until the future of the site could be assured as a public open space. The offer was to be made through the lord mayor to the City of London Corporation, conditional on Parliamentary sanction. At 3:00p.m. 5 September 1887 Queen's Park officially opened with several thousand people present.

The houses around Queen's Park were erected over a number of years starting with the north side of Harvist Road of which the majority were completed by 1899. The west side of Chevening Road was also under construction in 1899 by local builders Bennet and Gimbrett to the design of G. A. Sexton. Many builders contributed to the estate which helped to generate the varied architectural character that can be seen on Kempe, Keslake and Chamberlayne Roads.

The football team Queens Park Rangers was formed when a local boys team, founded by the vicar of the nearby St John's Church, merged with Christ Church Rangers and took their name from the area.  They went on to become a professional team in 1889. In July 2011 a plaque commemorating the event was unveiled by former star Stan Bowles on St Jude's Institute on Ilbert Street.

20th century
In 1915 the Bakerloo Line was extended to Queen's Park station, the nearby Kensal Green station appearing in 1916. Both stations offer easy access to Paddington, Charing Cross and Waterloo mainline stations

In 1917 Queens Park Rangers moved away from the area to the Loftus Road stadium in nearby Shepherd's Bush.

In summer 1979 The Jam recorded their music video When You're Young in Queen's Park, making use of the bandstand.

In 1986 Brent Council with the support of English Heritage made the area around Queen's Park a Conservation Area in recognition of its special architectural and historic character. Subsequently, in 1993 the designated area was extended westwards towards Chamberlayne Road.

Geography

Neighbouring areas
Neighbouring areas include Kensal Town to the south, Kensal Green to the west, Willesden to the north and Kilburn and Maida Vale to the east. There is a degree of overlap in perceptions of the extent of these areas.

The park

The park was laid out by Alexander McKenzie between March 1887 and June 1887. McKenzie was a leading figure in Victorian park design, part of an influential group of landscape designers which included Robert Marnock, Joseph Meston and William Robinson who led garden design away from the parterres and geometry of earlier Victorian
gardens to a more natural style of gardening.

Designed without any straight paths, Queen's Park makes extensive use of bold tree planting and shrubberies with natural outlines, and large open areas of lawn for recreation and sport.

Facilities in the park include six all-weather tennis courts, a pitch-and-putt course, an ornamental quiet garden, a children's playground with paddling pool, a children's animal farm and a café.

A landmark in the park is the bandstand, which was completed in 1887 using ironwork supplied by Walter Fariane & Co. of Glasgow, and a timber roof with wrought-iron scrolled devices to each facet, and a central wrought- iron lantern. The bandstand was Grade-II listed in 2000.

The park is managed by the City of London Corporation. In 2020 it won Green Flag status for the 24th year in a row, and an additional Green Heritage Site award for its care and conservation of open space and facilities.

The City of London focuses on sustainable management, recycling as much waste as possible. Grass clippings and wood are used to make mulch for shrubberies; everyday waste like cans, bottles and plastics are separated and recycled. Residents bring in their Christmas trees, which are mulched and return for use on their own gardens. Rain water is recycled via a new drainage system. All water runs into a holding tank underground and can be pumped to various areas when needed.

Places of worship

Queen's Park has a range of places of worship:

 St Anne with Holy Trinity, Brondesbury (Church of England)
 St Luke's West Kilburn, Fernhead Road (Church of England)
 St John the Evangelist, Kensal Green, Kilburn Lane (Church of England)
 Church of The Transfiguration (Roman Catholic)
 West Kilburn Baptist Church
 Imam Khoei Islamic Centre
 Harrow Road Jamme Mosque, Lancefield Street

Culture
The local community host two annual festivals at Queen's Park. 
Queen's Park Day in September brings together a funfair, stalls for local community groups and shops, various entertainments (including acrobats and bird of prey displays) and live music hosted by the Rhythm Studio who foster young bands and singers in the Queens Park area.
The Queen's Park Book Festival, in June, mixes national and international writers with local writing groups as part of the growing book festival movement across England.

Economy

The economic centre of Queen's Park is Salusbury Road, where there are many shops, pubs, cafes and restaurants.

The weekly Queen's Park Farmers' Market has around 40 stalls and takes place every Sunday between 10am and 2pm in the grounds of Salusbury Primary School on Salusbury Road, draws people from across north west London. The market was awarded market of the year at the Farmers’ Market and Retail Association Local Food Awards in 2012.

AMC Networks opened a  UK headquarters office housing 200 employees on Salusbury Road in 2017. 

It closed in 2022 and was replaced with a Jobcentre Plus.

Education
The area has several schools:
 Salusbury Primary School
 Ark Franklin Primary academy
 Islamia Primary School, established in 1983 by Yusuf Islam, a voluntary-aided Islamic faith school that educates around 390 pupils aged 4 to 11.
 Al-Sadiq and Al-Zahara Schools
Queen's Park Primary School in Droop Street is also home to the Westminster Children's University. 
Princess Frederica C of E Primary school
St Luke's CE Primary School, Fernhead Road 
The St Marylebone CE Bridge School, Third Avenue 
Wilberforce Primary School, Beethoven Street. 
Hopscotch Under 5's
Kenmont Primary school

Transport
Queen's Park station is a tube and Network Rail station in Travelcard Zone 2; it has direct links to south and central London via the Bakerloo line or to Euston, Watford Junction and intermediate stations via London Overground trains or to Harrow & Wealdstone station using Bakerloo line trains. Brondesbury Park station, on the London Overground North London Line, is near the northeast corner of Queen's Park.
To the northwest of the area is Kensal Rise station also on the North London line and to the west of Queens Park is Kensal Green station which serves the Bakerloo line on the underground and Watford DC line on the overground.

The area is also well served by the London Bus network with the 6, 18, 28, 36, 52, 187, 206, 228, 316, and 452 all passing through or along the boundaries.

Notable residents
Alison Brooks – architect
Lily Allen – singer / songwriter and author
Daniel Craig – actor
Jason Isaacs – actor
Sienna Miller – actress
Cillian Murphy – actor
Thandie Newton – actress
Michael Page – professional boxer and mixed martial artist
Alexandra Shulman – ex-editor of British Vogue
Zadie Smith – author
Samantha Spiro - actor
Edward Sutcliffe - Painter
Fredo – rapper
Dua Lipa – popstar
Karen Buck – Member of Parliament for Westminster North
Eartha Pond - former professional footballer, campaigner, and Chair of Queen's Park Community Council

References

External links 
 Queens Park Area Residents' Association
 Queens Park Day
 City of London Corporation – Queen's Park
Queens Park Community Council
City of London – Queen's Park

Areas of London
Districts of the London Borough of Brent
Districts of the City of Westminster
Parks and open spaces in the London Borough of Brent
Parks and open spaces of the City of London Corporation
Civil parishes in London